The 2011 Bracknell Forest Borough Council election took place on 5 May 2011, to elect all 42 councillors in 18 wards for Bracknell Forest Borough Council in England.  The election was held on the same day as other local elections in England as part of the 2011 United Kingdom local elections.  Despite an increase in its popular vote, the Labour Party was reduced to 2 seats, losing its group leader, whilst the Conservative Party secured a fifth term in office.

Ward Results
An asterisk (*) denotes an incumbent councillor standing for re-election

Ascot

Binfield with Warfield

Bullbrook

Central Sandhurst

College Town

Crown Wood

Crowthorne

Great Hollands North

Great Hollands South

Hanworth

Harmans Water

Little Sandhurst & Wellington

Old Bracknell

Owlsmoor

Priestwood & Garth

Warfield Harvest Ride

Wildridings & Central

Winkfield & Cranbourne

By-elections

Winkfield & Cranbourne

References

Bracknell Forest Borough Council elections
Bracknell